Wakefield is a civil parish in Carleton County, New Brunswick, Canada, located north on the west bank of the Saint John River north of Woodstock. It comprises two local service districts and part of a third, all of which are members of the Western Valley Regional Service Commission (WVRSC).

The Census subdivision of Wakefield Parish shares the civil parish's borders.

Origin of name
The parish may have been named for the city of Wakefield in Yorkshire, England.

Historian William Francis Ganong noted that the name predated the parish's erection, appearing in 1801 in the Land Memorials.

History
Wakefield was erected in 1803 within York County from unassigned lands north of Woodstock and Northampton Parishes. It included Simonds and Wilmot Parishes, along with parts of Bright, Brighton, Northampton, Peel, Richmond, Southampton, Wicklow, and Woodstock Parishes as well as part of Maine claimed by New Brunswick.

Boundaries
Wakefield Parish is bounded:

 on the north by the southern line of a land grant at the mouth of the Little Presque Isle Stream and its prolongation to the international border;
 on the east by the Saint John River;
 on the south by the southern line of a land grant on the Saint John River, opposite the junction of Route 105 and Newburg Road, prolonged to the Meduxnekeag River, and then the river to the international border;
 and on the west by Maine.
 It also includes all islands in front of it in the Saint John River. Whether the southern boundary extends through Pine Island or around it is not made clear by either the Territorial Division Act or the New Brunswick cadastral grant map of the area.

Evolution of boundaries
Wakefield originally extended north from Woodstock and Northampton Parishes to the mouth of Whitemarsh Creek and a point on the opposite side of the Saint John River, with its northern boundaries paralleling the two parishes to its south. Neither eastern nor western boundary was explicitly mentioned, simply "all that tract of country in the County of York" between the southern and northern boundaries of Wakefield.

In 1830 all of Wakefield east of the channel of the Saint John River was erected as Brighton Parish. This put at least one island in each parish.

In 1838 all of Wakefield south of the Meduxnekeag River was transferred to Woodstock Parish.

In 1842 the northern part of Wakefield was erected as Simonds Parish. Simonds included Wilmot Parish and a small part of Wicklow Parish. Later the same year New Brunswick's land boundary with Maine was settled by the Webster–Ashburton Treaty, ending Wakefield's implicit claim to part of Maine.

In 1850 the boundary within the Saint John River was altered, making all islands in front of Wakefield part of the parish.

In 1854 the southern boundary of Wakefield was extended across the Meduxnekeag to include parts of two grants that straddled the river.

Local service districts
All local service districts assess for the basic LSD services of fire protection, police services, land use planning, emergency measures, and dog control.

Wakefield Parish
The local service district of the parish of Wakefield originally comprised the entire parish. Today the LSD is divided into two taxing authorities, the larger Wakefield (Inside) including most of the LSD and Wakefield (Outside) in the northeastern part of the LSD, containing the communities of Victoria Corner and Waterville.

The parish LSD was established in 1966 to assess for fire protection. Community services were added in 1967. Recreational services were added in 1985 to the new taxing authority of Wakefield Inside.

Today both taxing authorities assess for community & recreational services. The taxing authorities are 215.00 Wakefield (Inside) and 215.01 Wakefield (Outside).

LSD advisory committee: Unknown.

Somerville
Somerville comprises a rough triangle around Route 103, Route 130, and the Somerville Road with an extension south along Route 103.

Somerville was established in 1971 to add street lighting and first aid & ambulance services; community services were removed, probably in error. Community services were restored and first aid & ambulance services removed in the rewrite of the LSD regulation in 1974.

Today Somerville assesses for street lighting. The taxing authority is 222.00 Somerville.

LSDAC: Unknown.

Lakeville
Lakeville includes a single land grant in Wakefield Parish, located on the western side Route 560, north of the prolongation of the Estey Road.

Communities
Communities at least partly within the parish;

 Belleville
 Briggs Corner
 Hartford
 Jackson Falls
 Jacksontown
 Jacksonville
 Lindsay
 Lower Wakefield
 Lower Waterville
 McKenna
 Oakville
 Rosedale
  Somerville
 South Greenfield
 Upper Waterville
  Victoria Corner
  Wakefield
  Waterville

Bodies of water
Bodies of water at least partly in the parish:

 Meduxnekeag River
  Saint John River
 Little Presque Isle Stream
 Lanes Creek
 Bennetts Lake
 Cox Lake
 Mud Lake
 Payson Lake
 York Lake

Other notable places
Parks, historic sites, and other noteworthy places at least partly in the parish.
  Iron Ore Hill
 Meduxnekeag Valley Protected Natural Area

Demographics

Population
Population trend

Language
Mother tongue (2016)

See also
List of parishes in New Brunswick

Notes

References

Local service districts of Carleton County, New Brunswick
Parishes of Carleton County, New Brunswick